Zavrhek is a small settlement above Škoflje in the Municipality of Divača in the Littoral region of Slovenia.

References

External links

Zavrhek on Geopedia

Populated places in the Municipality of Divača